Zhou Xiaofeng (March 1964 – 2 January 2022) was a Chinese entrepreneur and politician. He also sat on the 11th National People's Congress. Zhou died on 2 January 2022, at the age of 57.

References

1964 births
2022 deaths
21st-century Chinese politicians
Chinese Communist Party politicians
Politicians from Hebei
Delegates to the 11th National People's Congress